Northern College of Applied Arts and Technology, commonly known as Northern College, is a college of applied arts and technology in Northern Ontario. The college's catchment area extends across . More than 65 communities within Northeastern Ontario are served by four campuses located in Timmins, Kirkland Lake, Moosonee, and Temiskaming Shores (Haileybury). Annual enrolment is approximately 1,500 full-time students. Annual part-time and continuing education enrolment exceeds 11,000 students. Northern College is also home to the Haileybury School of Mines, which predates the college and was founded in 1912.

History
Northern College was established during the formation of Ontario's college system in 1967. Colleges of applied arts and technology were established on May 21, 1965. It is an Ontario College of Applied Arts and Technology. The school was founded in 1967 as part of a provincial initiative to create many such institutions to provide career-oriented diploma and certificate courses, as well as continuing education programs to Ontario communities.

The first campus was built in Kirkland Lake, followed by Porcupine (now part of the amalgamated city of Timmins), Haileybury (where the pre-existing Haileybury School of Mines joined as a campus; now part of the amalgamated city of Temiskaming Shores), and Moosonee, previously the James Bay Education Centre. The Northern College tartan was designed by Sylvia Martin.

Territorial Acknowledgement 
Northern College acknowledges that we are on the traditional and territorial lands of the Cree, Oji-Cree, Ojibway, and Algonquin homelands. We acknowledge these ancestral lands that we are gathered on, which continue to interconnect us all and remind us that we are all treaty people. First Nation communities now located on these lands include: Temagami, Timiskaming, Matachewan, Mattagami, Wahgoshig, Taykwa Tagamou, Beaverhouse, Flying Post, Moose Cree, Fort Albany, Kashechewan, Attawapiskat, Weenusk, and Metis Peoples Region #3.

The Indigenous History of our Region 
The typical narrative of Northern Ontario and indeed of Canada is often a short one, beginning a few hundred years ago with Europeans first arriving on North American shores in numbers, describing a wild land, a strange

people, and a harsh environment. This colonist narrative has done the legacy of ancient ways of life a disservice, overlooking countless unique cultures and casting aside a profound understanding of nature, natural order, and the balance between all living things.

A story of Canada and this region often begins with tales of brave explorers and enterprising prospectors conquering nature, ‘discovering’ riches and bringing with them a societal order and a civilized way of life.

It is easy to forget that these European men and women followed in the footsteps of Indigenous cultures, and with them, ancient routes, waterways, trails, and portages that had existed for millennia and had connected a vast and prosperous series of communities and societies spanning thousands of kilometres – down from the James Bay Lowlands to Michigan and beyond, from the Rockies in the west to the Atlantic in the east.

It is to be acknowledged that there is a historical void created by the Euro-centric dominated history of Canada.

The absence of remembering Indigenous contributions – oftentimes intentional in order to continue the hegemony – creates logistical issues of searching for cultural heritage sites in such a vast region of this country, and along with them, the oral traditions of Indigenous cultures, making it challenging to accurately depict a thorough and just understanding of this region before colonization.

We know that the Porcupine, Lake Temiskaming, Kenogami, Matatchewan and Moosonee have long been home to Indigenous peoples dating as far back as the Shield Archaic era (3000 B.C.), informing sacred and important places of trade, cultural connection and travel in these parts. Archeological evidence shows that the northeastern region of what is now named the province of Ontario has been home to Indigenous peoples for over 6,000 years – including cultures and peoples that weathered the Ice Age, adapted to changing climbs, treks, difficult topography, and survived living on the land with nomadic cultures that embodied informed respect for the natural world that surrounded us. As the pyramids in Egypt were being erected in the far East of the globe, hunting, gathering, and living in concert with nature were undertaken here, half a world away.

As the centuries passed and cultures evolved and changed, it is believed that two main Indigenous groups emerged in this region during the Middle Woodland era (200 B.C. – 700 A.D): The Black Duck (Ojibway) and Selkirk (Cree). These cultures would continue to evolve over generations into the Indigenous cultural groups, societies, and communities here today.

The European presence in this region has been recorded as early as the mid-1700s. The heady mix of natural abundance and the mission to spread the word of God drove immigrants further and further north in search of riches and the possibility of dominating (referred to as ‘civilizing’) Indigenous populations, which resulted in bloodshed and oppression.

With Europeans came a colonized way of life and, in turn, the gradual and inevitable move away from many aspects of a centuries-old cultural traditions. In a few short years, prospectors, speculators, and investors would flood the region, drawn by the promise of mineral riches and what they saw as an ‘unconquered’ frontier, utilizing the expertise and understandings of Indigenous peoples while pushing these same peoples out of our traditional lands and, along with displacing them, subjugating them.

By 1906, while the ink was drying on Treaty 9, the lifestyles, cultures, and way of life of Indigenous peoples in Canada would be forever changed, and for the most part, harmed.

The Canadian government’s focus on the eradication and assimilation of Indigenous peoples has been palpable here.

What was seen as untouched wilderness would be transformed into centres of industry, trees would fall, headframes would rise, earth removed, and rock exposed.

In short, the pursuit of material wealth would define the region and Indigenous peoples would struggle to maintain their way of life and experience justice as the first peoples of this region and country.

The story of Ontario’s northeast is embedded in the wider story of Canada – and it is to be placed in this historical context without being removed from it. To understand this region, one must also understand the conquest that occurred over conservation and how Canada’s Indigenous peoples have both suffered and risen in our resilience as peoples who inhabit these lands to this day, despite the onslaught of efforts meant to eradicate them.

It is within this context that the history of Northern College is shared. This story is placed with an acknowledgement of the lands and the Indigenous peoples who were first on those lands, who are so integral to Canadian history, as well as having created a legacy of survival all of their own.

Campuses 
Timmins Campus
Kirkland Lake Campus
 Haileybury Campus
 Moosonee Campus

Timmins Campus 
It is September of 1968. 

Students are beginning their first year of studies at Northern College’s Porcupine, now Timmins Campus. As they step onto the newly laid floors of the College building, they leaf through their college calendar which contains everything they need to begin their studies.

This building is temporary, erected in haste to accommodate the growing student body of the newly formed college in the North. Planning is already well underway on a more permanent, brick-and-mortar building, befitting of a post-secondary institution. They are the second group of students to attend this newly minted Northern College in Timmins; the class of 1968.

Their calendar outlines the history of the college they’ve chosen to attend, as their experience will be very different to those 71 students just a year ahead of them who were the first to attend this new institution in Timmins. What would become known as Northern College’s Porcupine Campus had humble beginnings in 1967, with students arriving at the McIntyre Centre in Schumacher to begin their studies, only miles away from the location where the permanent campus was being constructed. Moving between eight temporary classrooms built on the gymnasium floor, they would have to endure dim lighting and a noisy working environment to complete the studies diligently taught by their professors on makeshift chalkboards. Those with laboratory studies would have to travel to Schumacher High School, which had made its facilities available twice a week during the evening hours.

Their professors made use of a single office, which doubled as storage for the growing amount of equipment ordered for the college building being constructed on the other side of the city. They would use this space to prepare their lessons, conduct clerical work, and discuss what the future held for Northern.

Reminiscing of that inaugural semester, the calendar said, ‘what kept everyone going was the realization that soon, they would have their own building.’

Over the winter break, the move was made to the new building nestled on the shores of Porcupine Lake. The stacks of equipment were removed from the cramped offices at the McIntyre Centre and moved into the four rooms that were made available for studies as the remainder of the new building was hastily completed. Week by week, more and more of the new campus was made available to students, and, with time, the main campus of Northern College was firmly established. Beyond enduring less than ideal study conditions for most of their first year of studies, the burden for this initial group of Northern College students would be heavier still, as it would fall to them to help to establish the culture of the institution.

The students were up for the challenge. Clubs were established, a hockey team was created, and a Student Administrative Council was founded to liaise with the institution. Students even played a large role in the creation of the College crest and the establishment of its first motto: ‘Palman Qui Meruit Ferat’ or ‘Let him bear the reward who merits it.’

This time of discovery and innovation allowed students to experience what the school calendar described as: ”having had the opportunity to break new ground, to pioneer, to start from scratch unimpeded by a fixed way of doing things.” It was in this simple sentence that Northern College would establish itself to its students as an institution where their thoughts, perspectives and ideas would always have a place, where they would shape their education as much as their education would shape them. These are words that would ring true throughout the decades, even as courses changed, the campus expanded, and technology shifted. The calendar would establish another key message to these new Northern College students, saying:

“The academic standards at Northern are high, demanding serious application and hard work on the part of both students and staff. However, the rewards are correspondingly worthwhile and will last a lifetime.”

This is true of Northern College decades later. Students are serious about their studies, they are supported while they learn and employers look forward to welcoming them to their teams for this very reason.

Kirkland Lake (Northern Ontario Institute of Technology) 
The province would continue to expand the technical school system, establishing Lakehead University along with the Provincial Institute of Trades, where a young professor, John Koski would begin teaching in 1952. It would be Koski’s experiences at the Provincial Institute of Trades, formerly the Ryerson Institute of Technology, now known as the Toronto Metropolitan University, alongside his upbringing in Northern Ontario, that would place him on a path to play a major role in the founding and foundation of what would grow to become the Northern Ontario Institute of Technology (NOIT) and finally, Northern College.

Selected by the Robarts Government to spearhead the creation of the Northern Ontario Institute of Technology (NOIT) in Kirkland Lake, Koski set about founding what he hoped would be a successful educational institution where he grew up.

With no buildings available to suit his needs before classes began in September of 1962, Koski was given a three year trial period to make a Northern Ontario Technical Institution work. A pre-engineered building was on the way, but the first classes held at NOIT took place in the Sylvanite Recreational Hall, thanks to an agreement with the local chapter of the Lions Club.

Koski advertised the need for qualified and experienced teaching staff to help turn a three-year trial period into a longstanding educational institution, lining up five highly qualified technical professors with various backgrounds to create a strong faculty complement. From there, he hit the road to recruit students, stopping at every high school in the Northeast, choosing to recruit students directly from the classroom.

Koski then turned to the local and regional media to help spread the word about NOIT, offering interviews on the subject and promoting the fact that the Institute would be willing to make offers on what he called ‘trials until Christmas,’ for motivated students who lacked entry credits. Koski built a tight-knit educational experience for NOIT students, and shared a close relationship with his faculty, slowly building faith in the Institute and its mission, but always choosing to keep the three-year trial period outlined by the province to himself. 

By the time the trial had expired, it was clear to the Government that the initiative was a success. With that success, came 4.5 million dollars in funding that was set aside to construct the Northern Ontario Institute of Technology and by 1965, Koski had secured the purchase of the former Toburn Mine site.

That year marked the first convocation ceremony for NOIT, with 24 graduates crossing the stage, and according to the local newspaper, The Northern News, 21 of those grads had already secured career employment, with some of the students receiving multiple job offers.

By September of 1966, NOIT boasted almost 500 students, 15 new faculty members and a wider array of programs on offer, but the success of the trial would mean that change was once again on the horizon. By this time, the College system had been formally announced by the province and although construction of the NOIT campus would proceed, it was decided that NOIT and the Haileybury School of Mines would be joining with a newly organized and larger Northern College which would be connected to a main campus in Timmins.

Koski would go on to become the first President of the newly formed Cambrian College in Sudbury, but his legacy would be firmly ingrained in the Northern Ontario Institute of Technology

which was both a realized dream and labour of love for him.

Haileybury Campus (Haileybury School of Mines) 
Northern College, like almost every other college in the Ontario college system, was founded in 1967 as part of sweeping educational reform designed to meet the growing need for skilled labourers driven by an experiential approach to education.

Unlike many other colleges in the system, Northern would find itself inheriting stewardship of a decades old, truly unique and focused post-secondary institution whose practices would, in turn,

define the student experience at Northern.

Founded in 1912, the Haileybury School of Mines (HSM) proved to be a fundamental precursor to the modern educational system by directly identifying industry needs and tailoring an accessible curriculum to those needs. HSM was the singular vision of Asbury Wilson, a high school principal who called Haileybury home. Wilson recognized that many of his young students were destined to join the hundreds of men in his community who earned their wages in the Cobalt silver mines. He hoped that he could tailor the curriculum offered at his high school to better prepare those students for the work they would be doing after graduation.

The first of those courses would be offered to learners at the Cobalt YMCA, before moving to the basement of the Haileybury High School. By 1914, the provincial government officially recognized Wilson’s work, approving a diploma granting program in mining. By 1919 the school would inhabit its own building, known as the Mill building adjacent to the local high school, which would be expanded to better serve the growing student body a little over a decade later in 1931. As more and more young mining professionals entered the workforce armed with a first-rate education in mining techniques, the reputation of HSM began to take on a life of its own. The pride and professionalism instilled in its students carried over into the wider world of mining, proving to be a legacy that would write itself.

During the height of the Second World War, the school was forced to close, shuttering its doors in 1943 due to low enrolment and once again reopening again in 1945. This brief closure proved to be transformative for the institution. Following lessons learned at war, the province recognized a need for skilled workers to capitalize on Ontario’s mineral wealth and after several decades under the direction of the Haileybury High School, Haileybury School of Mines was formally recognized as the Provincial Institute of Mining.

The post-war years proved to be highly productive for the newly renamed institution, which picked up exactly where it left off in 1943, continuing to produce top-notch mining professionals who would continue on to highly successful careers in the local mining communities of Kirkland Lake, Timmins and around the globe. The institution would expand again in 1959 to accommodate its growing reputation and enrolment increases.

The beginnings of Northern College are much like the other colleges created and founded during the 1960s in Ontario. The push for accessible, industry-focused education in Ontario had been on the rise since over one million service men and women returned victorious from war-torn Europe in 1945.

The post-war economy was booming, and heavy industry desperately needed skilled workers to keep the momentum going. It would be over twenty years before the Ontario College system would take on the form we are familiar with today, but the province was busy at work laying the foundation for increased educational institutions in the province.

In 1946, the Ontario Government approved the concept of technical schools with a special outlined purpose, creating the Institute of Textiles in Hamilton and the Provincial Institute of Mines in Haileybury, lending further legitimacy to the Haileybury School of Mines, which had been in existence since 1912. HSM would continue to hone its highly impactful, hands on teaching methods throughout the 1950s and 60s, focusing on a regimented curriculum centred around a ‘talk and chalk’ teaching style and a full course load, instilling both knowledge and work ethic in its students.

By 1965, the reputation of HSM was such that it began to draw students from overseas, with a number of African students attending the school in order to bring the lessons learned in HSM classrooms back to their home countries, contributing broadly to the post-colonial African mining industry.

The Haileybury School of Mines has always been a unique learning experience for students, quickly developing its own alumni association in the early 1950s, while creating traditions in the process. Those traditions included the issuing of technologists’ and technicians’ rings at graduation and the pale blue letterman jackets that became a familiar sight in the tri-town area now known as Temiskaming Shores.

By the late 1960s, change would again come to the Haileybury School of Mines as it, and the newly founded Northern Ontario Institute of Technology (NOIT) in Kirkland Lake would join with a newly announced College campus in Timmins to become Northern College. 

Longstanding Provincial Institute of Mining Principal, O.E. Walli, would become Northern College’s first President, and faculty member Jack Frey would transition to become the first Dean of the Haileybury School of Mines under the stewardship of Northern College. Throughout the next few decades, the reputation of HSM would continue to grow, with alumni members like Alex Mosher, Bill Durrell, Jack Dunlop, Murray Watts, Colin Benner and thousands of other influential professionals going on to shape the Canadian and international mining industries.

As the Haileybury School of Mines approached its 100th anniversary in 2012, the school and the campus it calls home had grown significantly. Northern College’s influence continued to grow over the decades, broadening program offerings and widening the draw of potential students to the picturesque campus overlooking Lake Temiskaming. HSM’s mining programs were joined by a number of first rate Northern College post-secondary programs including veterinary sciences, business, law clerk, and general arts and sciences. All of these fields of study have served to cement

what has now become Northern College’s Haileybury Campus as one of the Institution’s most lively campuses, drawing students and faculty from throughout the province.

Moosonee Campus (James Bay Education Centre) 
In the remote communities that dot the western coast of James Bay, life is different than it is most other places in Ontario.

Geographically, the communities of Attawapiskat, Fort Albany, Kashechewan, Moose Factory and Moosonee are remote and only accessible by air or rail, in some cases, year-round, while a mix of forest access and ice roads provide vehicle access through the winter months.

Access is of major importance in these small, largely indigenous communities. Healthcare supports, goods and services, clean water, and education are needs that are as relevant today as they have been for decades.

In the early 1960s, the James Bay Education Centre (JBEC) was founded as a heavy equipment training centre, offering skills-based training to these remote communities for over 20 years. In 1982, the Education Centre became part of Northern College and was renamed the Moosonee Campus.

As part of Northern College, the programs offered at the Moosonee Campus were expanded significantly, adding Business, Early Childhood Education, Community Services and Nursing; programs specifically tailored to meet the unique needs of the remote communities the campus served. For the communities of James Bay, the arrival of Northern College, along with expanded programming, meant opportunity closer to home, with a chance for students to pursue a post-secondary education without having to leave their region and the support systems so important to them, in their home communities.

Over five years, Northern College offered its renowned Nursing program at the Moosonee Campus, resulting in 50 local graduates who quickly went to work in their home communities, resulting in a direct impact on the quality of health care along the James Bay Coast. Many of those graduates are still lending their empathy, expertise, and skill to the broader healthcare sector in the region.

For the Moosonee Campus, the success of its Nursing program is a case study for a broader impact. By providing direct, localized training to its remote area, the impact on the quality of life of many Indigenous patients could be felt almost immediately.

Though its guiding principles have remained the same since its inception in the early 1960s, the scope of what is possible at the Moosonee Campus has changed, ever shifting to meet the unique needs of the students along the James Bay Coast.

Northern College has expanded its presence over the years, building access centres in many James Bay communities. These access centres serve as a direct conduit to post-secondary education by providing students living in remote areas with opportunities to gain their high school diplomas, enrol in preparatory courses and lay a successful foundation to pursue higher education.

It is through these pathways to education and training that Northern has become a viable and preferred option for students hailing from these coastal communities. Providing a familiar face as they learn and a comfortable environment to study with specialized Indigenous supports and the presence of Elders and sacred spaces, combines to create high completion rates and empowerment for learners.

The addition of the Moosonee Campus to the Northern College family in 1982 marked the beginning of a journey that would see the wider college embrace and integrate Indigenous culture, ways of learning, and acknowledgement.

Although the journey to reconciliation and understanding is never done and has a long way to go, Northern College, its staff, faculty, and students continue to embrace the wisdom, teachings and understandings of Canada’s first peoples and embed them into the operations of the College with the hope of creating a more healing and supportive environment for all learners in the region.

Programs 
16: Northern College Certificate
16: Ontario College Certificate
36: Ontario College Diploma 
10: Ontario College Advanced Diploma 
3: Ontario College Graduate Certificate 
10: Apprenticeship 
1: Collaborative Degree 
221: Articulation Agreements

Partnerships

Taizhou University

Residences
Timmins Campus Residence
Haileybury Campus Residence

See also
Higher education in Canada
List of agricultural universities and colleges
List of colleges in Ontario
List of universities in Canada

References

1967 establishments in Ontario
Colleges in Ontario
Education in Cochrane District
Education in Timiskaming District
Educational institutions established in 1967
Education in Timmins
Kirkland Lake
Temiskaming Shores